Suzanne Seggerman is the co-founder of Games for Change and is a public speaker and adviser on new media and social impact. At the 2015 Annual Game Developers Conference she was given an award by the Higher Education Video Game Alliance along with Dr. Mary Flanagan, Professor of Film and Media at Dartmouth College and Dr. James Paul Gee, Professor of Literacy Studies at Arizona State University.

Career
Seggerman was co-founder and former president of Games for Change (G4C), a non-profit that promotes and supports the emerging uses of video games for humanitarian and educational purposes.  The mission of G4C is to harness the extraordinary power of video games to engage people in the most pressing issues of our day, and to foster and promote new kinds of games. Early examples of games for change include Honorable Justice Sandra Day O'Connor's suite of games called iCivics; Food Force a game about global hunger created by the World Food Program; and Ayiti: the Cost of Life , a game about poverty set in Haiti. Seggerman ran G4C since its inception in 2004, acting as the curator of the Games for Change Festival, and a frequent speaker and advisor on video games and social impact.

Seggerman also co-founded PETLab (Prototyping Education and Technology Lab), a public interest design and research lab at Parsons The New School for Design, supported by grants from MTV and the MacArthur Foundation.

Her speaker resume includes Sundance Film Festival, PopTech, and TEDx. As an  invited expert on various new media projects, she has advised on Microsoft’s Imagine Cup, Scholastic Art and Writing Awards and the Knight Foundation News Challenge.

Known for her expertise in games and social impact, she has often been featured in the press.

Before co-founding Games for Change, Seggerman was a director at new media think tank Web Lab, where she worked since its inception, with its founder Marc Weiss, the creator of the PBS Independent film series P.O.V. Web Lab started as an early think tank dedicated to exploring and funding serious issues at the outset of the World Wide Web While at Web Lab, Seggerman also co-curated Provocations in 2003, an exhibition dedicated to digital games and social issues, featuring artists Natalie Jeremijenko, Tamiko Thiel, Michael Mateas, Brody Condon, Eddo Stern and Anne-Marie Schleiner.

Previous to her work in new media, Seggerman was production manager for the PBS documentary series by Ken Burns and Stephen Ives called "The West".

Early life and education
Seggerman grew up in Fairfield, Connecticut, the daughter of Harry G. A. Seggerman, who had been vice chairman of Fidelity, and Anne Crellin Seggerman. She has five siblings; Patricia Seggerman, Marianne Seggerman, Yvonne Seggerman, Henry Seggerman, and Ed Seggerman. Seggerman received a B.A. from Kenyon College in Gambier, Ohio, and a master's degree from New York University’s Interactive Telecommunications Program (ITP).

Legal issues
In October 2010, Seggerman pleaded guilty to conspiracy and tax fraud related to a $12M 2001 inheritance her family received in a Swiss bank account from her father. As of September 9, 2014, her sentencing has been postponed pending the outcome of the family financial adviser, Michael Little's, trial. She was a cooperating witness in that trial, and in 2014, and again in 2019, the probation department recommended probation.

In a surprise decision, on June 26, 2019 the four siblings Henry, Yvonne, Suzanne and Ed were each sentenced to prison. Suzanne received a four month sentence which she completed in December 2019. The siblings, all well-educated and accomplished people, had funneled their inherited money into the U.S. tax-free through a variety of means: shell companies, a fraudulent foundation and carrying just under $10,000 cash on return trips from Switzerland.

References

External links

Suzanne Seggerman's website

American nonprofit executives
Women in the video game industry
Year of birth missing (living people)
Living people
Kenyon College alumni
Video game businesspeople